Verblyuzhy is a rural locality (a settlement) in Udachensky Selsoviet of Akhtubinsky District, Astrakhan Oblast, Russia. The population was 269 as of 2010. There are 5 streets.

Geography 
Verblyuzhy is located 92 km southeast of Akhtubinsk (the district's administrative centre) by road. Udachnoye is the nearest rural locality.

References 

Rural localities in Akhtubinsky District